Emil Todorov (born 17 March 1975) is a retired Bulgarian footballer who played as a striker.

External links
  Profile

1975 births
Living people
Bulgarian footballers
First Professional Football League (Bulgaria) players
Second Professional Football League (Bulgaria) players
PFC Spartak Pleven players
PFC Cherno More Varna players
PFC Chernomorets Burgas players
PFC Marek Dupnitsa players
PFC Beroe Stara Zagora players
Association football forwards